Samarth Ramdas (c. 1608 – c. 1681), also known as Sant Ramdas or Ramdas Swami, was an Indian Hindu saint, philosopher, poet, writer and spiritual master. He was a devotee of the Hindu deities Rama and Hanuman.

Early life
Ramdas or previously Narayan was born at Jamb, a village in present-day Jalna district, Maharashtra on the occasion of Rama Navami, probably in 1608. He was born into a Marathi Deshastha Rigvedi Brahmin family to Suryajipanta and Ranubai Thosar. His father was a devotee of Surya, the solar deity. Ramdas had an elder brother named Gangadhar. His father died when Narayan was around seven years of age. Narayan turned into an introvert after the demise of his father and was often noticed to be engrossed in thoughts about the divine.

According to legend, Narayan fled his wedding ceremony upon hearing a pundit chant the word 'Saavdhan' (Beware!) during a customary Hindu wedding ritual. Then at the age of twelve, he is believed to have walked to Panchavati, a Hindu pilgrimage town near Nashik. He later moved to Taakli near Nashik. At Taakli, he spent the next twelve years as an ascetic in complete devotion to Rama. During this period, he adhered to a rigorous daily routine and devoted most of his time to meditation, worship and exercise. He is thought to have attained enlightenment at the age of 24. He adopted the name Ramdas around this period. He later had an idol of Hanuman installed at Taakli.

Pilgrimage and spiritual movement
After departing Taakli, Ramdas embarked on a pilgrimage across the Indian subcontinent. He traveled for twelve years making observations on contemporary social life. He had these observations recorded in two of his literary works Asmani Sultania and Parachakraniroopan. These works provide a rare insight into the then prevalent social conditions in the Indian subcontinent. He also traveled to the Himalayas during this period. Around this time, he met the sixth Sikh Guru Hargobind at Srinagar.

After concluding his pilgrimage, he returned to Mahabaleshwar, a hill-town near Satara. Later while at Masur, he arranged for Rama Navami celebrations that were reportedly attended by thousands. He is also claimed to have discovered a few idols of Rama in the Krishna river around this time.

As part of his mission to redeem spirituality among the masses and unite the Hindu populations, Ramdas initiated the Samarth sect. He established several matha (monasteries) across the Indian subcontinent. He is claimed to have established somewhere between 700 and 1100 matha during his travels, although Narahar Phatak in his biography of Ramdas claimed that the actual number of matha established by him may have been lesser. Around 1648, he had an idol of Rama installed at a newly built temple in Chaphal, a village near Satara. He initially had eleven Hanuman temples constructed in various regions of southern Maharashtra. These are now together referred to as the 11-Maruti (see list below). He also had Hanuman temples built in other parts of Maharashtra and across the Indian subcontinent. Temples established by him have been found across India in regions including Jaipur, Varanasi (also Kashi), Thanjavur and Ujjain. He also had a temple dedicated to the Hindu female deity Durga constructed at Pratapgad, a fort near Satara.

Literary contribution and philosophy

Literary works
Ramdas had extensive literature written during his lifetime. His literary works include Dasbodh, Karunashtakas, Sunderkand, Yuddhakand, Poorvarambh, Antarbhav, Aatmaaram, Chaturthman, Panchman, Manpanchak, Janaswabhawgosavi, Panchsamasi, Saptsamasi, Sagundhyan, Nirgundhyan, Junatpurush, Shadripunirupan, Panchikaranyog, Manache Shlok and Shreemad Dasbodh. Unlike saints subscribing to the Warkari tradition, Ramdas is not considered to embrace pacifism and his writings include strong expressions encouraging militant means to counter the aggressive Islamic invaders. 

A major part of his Marathi literature is in the form of verses.

Listed below are some of his notable literary works.
Manache Shlok (co-written by Kalyan Swami)
Dasbodh
Shree Maruti Stotra
Aatmaaram
11-Laghu Kavita
Shadripu Nirupan
Maan Panchak
Chaturthmaan
Raamayan (Marathi-Teeka)

His compositions also include numerous aarti (worship rituals). One of his most popular aarti commemorates the Hindu deity Ganesha, and is popularly known as Sukhakarta Dukhaharta. Many believe that the bhajan "Raghupati Raghava Raja Ram" is based on a mantra by Ramdas.

His other works include an aarti commemorating Hanuman, Satrane Uddane Hunkaar Vadani and an aarti dedicated to the Hindu deity Khandoba, Panchanan haivahan surabhushan lila. He also composed aarti in dedication to other Hindu deities. His well-known work Dasbodh has been translated to several other Indian languages. The original copy of Dasbodh is currently placed at a matha in Domgaon, a village in present-day Osmanabad district, Maharashtra.

Philosophy 
According to Vinayak Bokil and Balacharya Khuperkar Shastri, Ramdas was a proponent of Dvaita, a philosophy first proposed by Madhvacharya.

Ramdas was an exponent of Bhakti Yoga or the path of devotion. According to him, total devotion to Rama brings about spiritual evolution. He emphasized upon the importance of physical strength and knowledge towards individual development. He expressed his admiration for warriors and highlighted their role in safeguarding the society. He was of the opinion that saints must not withdraw from society but instead actively engage towards social and moral transformation. He aimed to resuscitate the Hindu culture after its disintegration over several centuries owing to consistent foreign occupation. He also called for unity among the Marathas to preserve and promote the local culture. 

Ramdas frequently expressed his abhorrence for distinctions based on caste and creed. He advocated for the abolition of social classes. He encouraged the participation of women in religious work and offered them positions of authority. He had 18 female disciples, among who Vennabai headed the matha at Miraj near Sangli while Akkabai managed matha at Chaphal and Sajjangad near Satara. He is said to have once reprimanded an aged man who voiced his opinion against female participation in religious affairs. Ramdas reportedly responded by saying "Everyone came from a woman's womb and those who did not understand the importance of this were unworthy of being called men". According to him, an equal social status between men and women is a prerequisite for social development. In Dasbodh, Ramdas eulogizes the virtues of aesthetic handwriting (Chapter 19.10, Stanza 1-3).

Samarth sect

Ramdas initiated the Samarth sect to revive spirituality in the society. He established several matha during his lifetime.

Links with contemporaries

Shivaji and Sambhaji 

The first Maratha ruler Shivaji Bhonsle I was a contemporary of Ramdas.
Historian Stewart Gordon concludes about their relationship:

Guru Hargobind
	
According to a manuscript in the Sikh tradition known as Panjāh Sakhīān, Ramdas met Guru Hargobind (1595 - 1644) at Srinagar near the Garhwal hills. This meeting also finds a mention in an 18th-century Marathi literary work known as Ramdas Swamichi Bakhar composed by Hanumant Swami. The meeting probably took place in the early 1630s during Ramdas' pilgrimage to northern India and Guru Hargobind's journey to Nanakmatta, a town in present-day Uttarakhand. When they met, Guru Hargobind had probably just returned from a hunting excursion.
	
During their conversation, Ramdas reportedly asked "I had heard that you occupy the Gaddi (seat) of Guru Nanak. Guru Nanak was a tyāgī sādhu, a saint who had renounced the world. You possess arms and keep an army and horses. You allow yourself to be addressed as Sacha Patshah, the true king. What sort of a sādhu are you?" Hargobind replied, "Internally a hermit and externally a prince. Arms mean protection to the poor and destruction of the tyrant. Baba Guru Nanak had not renounced the world but had renounced māyā - the self and ego." Ramdas is reported to have said, "Yeh hamare man bhavti hai" (This appeals to my mind).

Residences
Ramdas moved all across the Indian subcontinent and usually resided in caves (ghal in Marathi). Some of these located in present-day Maharashtra are listed below.

 Ramghal, Sajjangad
 Morghal, at Morbag near Sajjangad
 Tondoshighal, north of Chaphal
 Taakli, near Nashik
 Chandragiri, opposite Vasantgad, near Karad
 Helwak, near Helwak village
 Shiganwadi, near Chandragiri
Shivtharghal, near Mahad

Death
Ramdas died at Sajjangad in 1681. For five days prior, he had ceased consuming food and water. This practice of fasting unto death is known as Prayopaveshana. He continuously recalled the taraka mantra "Shriram hanuman Ram Jai Jai Ram" while resting besides an idol of Rama brought from Tanjore. His disciples, Uddhav Swami and Akka Swami remained in his service during this period. Uddhav Swami had the final rites performed.

Legacy
Ramdas served an inspiration for many 19th and 20th-century thinkers, historians and social reformers such as Bal Gangadhar Tilak, Keshav Hedgewar, Vishwanath Rajwade and Ramchandra Ranade. Tilak in particular, derived inspiration from Ramdas when devising aggressive strategies to counter the British colonial rule. Nana Dharmadhikari, a spiritual teacher promoted views of Ramdas' views through his spiritual discourses. Gondavalekar Maharaj, a 19th-century spiritual master promoted Ramdas' spiritual methods through his teachings. Bhausaheb Maharaj, founder of the Inchegeri Sampradaya used Dasbodh as a means of instruction to his disciples. Dasbodh has been translated and published by the American followers of Ranjit Maharaj, a spiritual teacher of the Inchegeri Sampradaya.

Ramdas had a profound influence on Keshav Hedgewar, the founder of Hindu nationalist organization Rashtriya Swayamsevak Sangh. Hedgewar quoted Ramdas on numerous occasions and would often note the latter's views in his personal diary. According to one entry in his diary dated March 4, 1929, Hedgewar writes "Shri Samarth did not want anything for himself. He mindfully guarded against self-pride which could result from success and greatness. Ingraining this discipline, he devoted himself to the welfare of his people and a higher self-realisation."

Cultural legacy
Ramdas is a revered figure in Maharashtra, and relevant to contemporary culture of Maharashtra through his literary contributions. His  aarti to Ganesh is recited first in many Hindu rituals.His Maruti Stotra, a hymn in praise of Maruti is recited by school children and athletes at traditional gyms, or Akhada in Maharashtra. Generations of Marathi children recited his manache shlok at home, or at school Savarkar, the proponent of Hindutva took inspiration from Dasbodh regarding protection for the dharma and the country. Ramdas' Maruti worship has been appropriated by Hindu Nationalist groups such as Shivsena in Maharashtra.

References

Bibliography

Sources
 "Shakti Saushthava शक्ती सौष्ठव" by D. G. Godse
 "Vinoba Saraswat" by Vinoba Bhave (edited by Ram Shewalkar)
 "Rajwade Lekhsangrah" by Vishwanath Kashinath Rajwade (edited by Tarkatirth Laxmanshastri Joshi)
 "Tryambak Shankar Shejwalkar Nivadak Lekhsangrah" by T S Shejwalkar (collection- H V Mote, Introduction- G D Khanolkar)

External links
Ramdas Swami Sahitya Shodh
 Dasbodh.com
 Article on Root of Harikatha

1608 births
1681 deaths
17th-century Hindu religious leaders
17th-century Indian poets
Hindu philosophers and theologians
Inchegeri Sampradaya
Marathi-language poets
Marathi-language writers
People from Jalna district
People from Marathwada
Vaishnava saints
Scholars from Maharashtra
Marathi Hindu saints
Harikatha exponents